Angels Flight is a landmark and historic  narrow gauge funicular railway in the Bunker Hill district of Downtown Los Angeles, California. It has two funicular cars, named Olivet and Sinai, that run in opposite directions on a shared cable.

The funicular has operated on two different sites, using the same cars and station elements. The original Angels Flight location, with trackage along the side of Third Street Tunnel and connecting Hill Street and Olive Street, operated from 1901 until it was closed in 1969, when its site was cleared for redevelopment.

The second Angels Flight location opened one half block south of the original location in 1996, mid-block between 3rd and 4th Streets, with tracks connecting Hill Street and California Plaza. It was shut down in 2001, following a fatal accident, and took nine years to commence operations again. The railroad restarted operations on March 15, 2010. It was closed again from June 10, 2011, to July 5, 2011, and then again after a minor derailment incident on September 5, 2013. The investigation of this 2013 incident led to the discovery of potentially serious safety problems in both the design and the operation of the funicular.

Before the 2013 service suspension, the cost of a one-way ride was 50 cents (25 cents for Metro pass holders). Although it was marketed primarily as a tourist novelty, it was frequently used by local workers to travel between the Downtown Historic Core and Bunker Hill. In 2015, the executive director of the nearby REDCAT arts center described the railroad as an important "economic link", and there was pressure for the city to fund and re-open the railroad. After safety enhancements were completed, Angels Flight reopened for public service on August 31, 2017, now charging $1 for a one-way ride (50 cents for TAP card users).

Original location 
Built in 1901 with financing from Colonel J.W. Eddy, as the "Los Angeles Incline Railway", Angels Flight began at the west corner of Hill Street at Third and ran for two blocks uphill (northwestward) to its Olive Street terminus. Angels Flight consisted of two vermillion "boarding stations" and two cars, named Sinai and Olivet, pulled up the steep incline by metal cables powered by engines at the upper Olive Street station. As one car ascended, the other descended, carried down by gravity. An archway labeled "Angels Flight" greeted passengers on the Hill Street entrance, and this name became the official name of the railway in 1912 when the Funding Company of California purchased the railway from its founders.

The original Angels Flight was a conventional funicular, with both cars connected to the same haulage cable. Unlike more modern funiculars it did not have track brakes for use in the event of cable breakage, but it did have a separate safety cable which would come into play in case of breakage of the main cable. It operated for 68 years with a good safety record, with three notable exceptions: in 1913 a derailment occurred whereby a car was jumped and one lady with it, in 1937 when a sleeping salesman was dragged several yards by the car, and a fatal accident in 1943 when a pedestrian walking up the tracks was killed.

During operation in its original location, the railroad was owned and operated by six additional companies following Colonel Eddy. In 1912 Eddy sold the railroad to Funding Company of Los Angeles who in turn sold it to Continental Securities Company in 1914. Robert W. Moore, an engineer for Continental Securities, purchased Angels Flight in 1946. In 1952 Lester B. Moreland and Byron Linville, a prominent banker at Security First National Bank, purchased it from Moore and the following year Lester B. Moreland's family purchased Byron Linville's interest in the Railway, becoming sole stockholder. In 1962 the city forced Moreland to sell though condemnation and the city's redevelopment agency hired Oliver & Williams Elevator Company to run it until it was shut down on May 18, 1969. The following day the dismantling began and the cars were hauled away to be stored in a warehouse. The railroad's arch, station house, drinking fountain, and other artifacts were taken to an outdoor storage yard in Gardena, California.

The only fatality that involved the original Angels Flight occurred in the autumn of 1943, when a sailor attempting to walk up the track itself was crushed beneath one of the cars.

In November 1952, the Beverly Hills Parlor of the Native Daughters of the Golden West erected a plaque to commemorate fifty years of service by the railway. The plaque reads:

In 1962, at its first meeting, the city's new Cultural Heritage Board designated Angels Flight a Los Angeles Historic-Cultural Monument (No. 4), along with four other locations. Los Angeles was early in enacting preservation laws, and the first sites chosen each were "considered threatened to some extent," according to the history of the board, now the Cultural Heritage Commission.

Dismantling 
The railway was closed on May 18, 1969 when the Bunker Hill area underwent a controversial total redevelopment which destroyed and displaced a community of almost 22,000 working-class families renting rooms in architecturally significant but run-down buildings, to a modern mixed-use district of high-rise commercial buildings and modern apartment and condominium complexes. Both of the Angels Flight cars, Sinai and Olivet, were then placed in storage at 1200 S. Olive Street, Los Angeles. This was the location of Sid and Linda Kastner's United Business Interiors. At this location the Kastners maintained "The Bandstand," a private museum. The Bandstand featured antique coin-operated musical instruments where one of the cars (Sinai) was on display in the museum. Olivet was stored in the garage of the building. They were stored at this location for 27 years at no charge in anticipation of the railway's restoration and reopening, which according to the city's Redevelopment Agency, was originally slated to take place within two years.

Reconstruction 
After being stored for 27 years, the funicular was rebuilt and reopened by the newly formed Angels Flight Railway Foundation on February 24, 1996, half a block south of the original site. Although the original cars, Sinai and Olivet, were used, a new track and haulage system was designed and built, a redesign which had unfortunate consequences five years later.

Car movement was controlled by an operator inside the upper station house, who was responsible for visually determining that the track and vehicles were clear for movement, closing the platform gates, starting the cars moving, monitoring the operation of the funicular cars, observing car stops at both stations, and collecting fares from passengers. The cars themselves did not carry any staff members. Angels Flight was added to the National Register of Historic Places on October 13, 2000.

2001 accident 
On February 1, 2001, Angels Flight had a serious accident when car Sinai, approaching the upper station, instead rolled downhill uncontrollably and collided into Olivet near the lower station. The accident killed a tourist, 83-year-old Leon Praport, and injured seven others, including Praport's wife, Lola.

The National Transportation Safety Board (NTSB) conducted an investigation into the accident and determined that the probable cause was the improper design and construction of the Angels Flight funicular drive and the failure of the various regulatory bodies to ensure that the railway system conformed to initial safety design specifications and known funicular safety standards. The NTSB further remarked that the company that designed and built the drive, control, braking and haul systems, Lift Engineering/Yantrak, was no longer in business and that the whereabouts of the company's principal was unknown.

Unlike the original, the new funicular used two separate haulage systems (one for each car), with the two systems connected to each other, the drive motor, and the service brake by a gear train; it was the failure of this gear train that was the immediate cause of the accident since it effectively disconnected Sinai both from Olivets balancing load and from the service brake. There were emergency brakes that acted on the rim of each haulage drum, but due to inadequate maintenance, the emergency brakes for both cars were inoperative, which left Sinai without any brakes once its physical connection to the service brake was lost. Contrary to what might be expected, the new funicular was constructed with neither safety cable nor track brakes, either of which would have prevented the accident; the NTSB was unable to identify another funicular worldwide that operated without either of these safety features.

 Records indicate that the emergency brake had been inoperative for 17 to 26 months due to the fact that a normally closed hydraulic solenoid valve had been placed in a location where the design called for a normally open valve and that its ill fitted solenoid was burned out.

During the 17 to 26 months that the emergency braking system was not operating, the braking system was tested daily, but since the service brake and emergency brake were tested simultaneously, there was no way to tell if the emergency brake was functioning without looking at the brake pads or hydraulic pressure gauges during the test. The test was always performed with the Sinai car traveling uphill, which meant that when the power was cut and the brakes applied (as part of the test), Sinais momentum caused the car to continue moving uphill a short distance (slackening the cable) and then to roll back from gravity, jerking the cable tight.

If the emergency brakes had been functional, they would have caught Sinai when the cable snapped tight, but without the emergency brakes, the force of the jerk caused by the daily test was directed through the spline (the part that failed) and to the service brake. In addition, it was found that the original design called for the spline to be made of AISI 1018 steel on one drawing and of AISI 8822 steel on a different drawing, but it is unlikely that this ambiguity in the design contributed to the accident. However, regular analysis of gear box oil-samples was discontinued in May 1998, despite the fact that the company performing the tests recommending that the rising particulate level in the oil samples warranted the test occurring more frequently. The continued rising particulate level may have been in part caused by unusual wear of the splines. Continued testing could have resulted in an inspection to locate the cause of the unusual wear.Besides the design failures in the haulage system, the system was also criticised by the NTSB for the lack of gates on the cars and the absence of a parallel walkway for emergency evacuation. The funicular suffered serious damage in the accident.

Evaluation 
The death and injuries could have been avoided if any one of the following had taken place:

Repair 
 

On November 1, 2008, both of the repaired and restored Angels Flight cars, Sinai and Olivet, were put back on their tracks and, on January 16, 2009, testing began on the railway. On November 20, 2009, another step in the approval process was achieved. On March 10, 2010, the California Public Utilities Commission approved the safety certificate for the railroad to begin operating again.

The new drive and safety system completely replaced the system which was the cause of the fatal 2001 accident. Like the original Angels Flight design and most traditional funicular systems, the new drive system incorporates a single main haulage cable, with one car attached to each end. Also like the original design, a second safety cable is utilized. To further enhance safety, unlike the original design, each car now has a rail brake system, as a backup to the main backup emergency brakes on each bull-wheel. Another added safety feature is an independent evacuation motor to move the cars should the main motor fail for any reason.

Reopening and temporary closing 
Angels Flight reopened to the public for riding on March 15, 2010. The local media covered the event with interest. Only a month after re-opening, Angels Flight had had over 59,000 riders. It connected the Historic Core and Broadway commercial district with the hilltop Bunker Hill California Plaza urban park and the Museum of Contemporary Art – MOCA. The cost of a one-way ride at that time was 50 cents, 25 cents with TAP card.

On June 10, 2011, the California Public Utilities Commission ordered Angels Flight to immediately cease operations due to wear on the steel wheels on the two cars. Inspectors determined that their fifteen-year-old wheels needed replacing. The railway reopened on July 5, 2011, after eight new custom-made steel wheels were installed on the two cars.

2013 accident 
On September 5, 2013, one car derailed near the middle of the guideway. One passenger was on board the derailed car, and five passengers were on board the other car. There were no injuries. Passengers had to be rescued from the cars by firefighters. The brake safety system had been "intentionally" bypassed using a small tree branch.

The NTSB also noted a problem with the basic design: "The car body and the wheel-axle assembly are not articulated." The passing section of the track involves a short turning section which allows the cars to pass each other. The axles do not turn to follow the track, resulting in the wheel flanges grinding against the rail, causing excessive wheel wear. This problem, combined with safety system problems which caused unwanted track brake deployment, resulted in a derailment.

2017 reopening 
Plans to bring the railway back into service began in January 2017. Safety upgrades were made to the doors of the cars, and an evacuation walkway was added adjacent to the track. These enhancements were made by ACS Infrastructure Development and SENER through an agreement with Angels Flight Railway Foundation in exchange for a share of the funicular's revenue over the next three decades. Angels Flight reopened for public service on August 31, 2017.

In arts and popular culture

Film and video 

 Angels Flight's debut on film was probably Good Night, Nurse! (1918), but it got its first real close-up in a 1920 one-reel comedy of errors, All Jazzed Up.
 Angels Flight features in The Impatient Maiden (1932). The two female leads live in an apartment very near Angels Flight. The extended opening scene in the movie is set aboard an Angels Flight car, and in one interior apartment scene a set of lights are seen through a window ascending at a steep angle, depicting one of the Angels Flight cars moving upward.
 Angels Flight appears in the 1947 movie The Unfaithful. Actress Marta Mitrovich rides it from top to bottom at about the 24 minute mark of the movie.
 Angels Flight is seen during a street chase scene in the 1948 film Hollow Triumph. Paul Henreid's character kicks the man chasing him off the back of the car as it ascends.
 Angels Flight is featured in a 20-second sequence showing the two cars passing in the film Night Has a Thousand Eyes (1948).
 Angels Flight is seen at roughly 46 minutes in for about 8 seconds, one car going down and then the second car going up and passing the downward moving car as Van Heflin flees from Robert Ryan through night time Los Angeles in the film noir, Act of Violence (1949).
 Angels Flight is seen through the windows a couple of times during the 'planning' scene in the noir film Criss Cross (1949).
 In the 1951 remake of the classic Fritz Lang film, M, there is a scene in the opening credits shot from inside one of the Angels Flight cars, of a man jumping in at the last minute as it starts to ascend. The scene continues to go on for several more moments as the car makes its way up the hill, and a man, who is presumably the child killer, looks out the back door at the nighttime traffic.
 Angels Flight features in the 1952 crime thriller The Turning Point, with William Holden and Alexis Smith taking a ride up it to follow a lead.
 Angels Flight is seen in a 1953 TV episode of Boston Blackie called "Death Does a Rhumba".
 In Cry of the Hunted (1953), Jory (Vittorio Gassman), a prisoner being transported, escapes and rides the Angels Flight to evade capture.
 Angels Flight appears in The Glenn Miller Story (1954). Early in the film when Miller (James Stewart) visits a pawn shop on Clay Street, the adjacent Angels Flight is clearly visible.
 Angels Flight appears in the 1955 film Kiss Me Deadly at about 55'45", as Ralph Meeker portrayed Mike Hammer, who drives an automobile underneath the funicular tracks in order to park prior to a visit of one of the old Bunker Hill mansions which had been turned into a flophouse and in which a "person of interest" in his case resides.
 Angels Flight appears in the 1956 film Indestructible Man at about 40'00". Lon Chaney Jr. rides up to Olive Street and the Hillcrest Hotel. Marian Carr later rides down to Hill Street. In one scene, you can barely make out a sign showing the cost to ride Angels Flight is "ROUND TRIP OR TWO RIDES – 5 CENTS" and "30 RIDE BOOK – 50 CENTS".
 The 1956 Kent Mackenzie short film Bunker Hill: A Tale of Urban Renewal features Angels Flight.
 Angels Flight is seen several times in the 1961 Kent Mackenzie film The Exiles, which dramatizes the lives of several real Native Americans living on Bunker Hill in 1958 (when the film was shot). The DVD of The Exiles also includes the 1956 Kent Mackenzie short film Bunker Hill: A Tale of Urban Renewal and the 1969 short film, The Last Day of Angels Flight..
 In 1963 the railway appeared in the cult trash horror classic The Incredibly Strange Creatures Who Stopped Living and Became Mixed-Up Zombies, where one of the characters walks up the hill alongside the tracks.

 Glenn Ford rides Angels Flight in a brief scene from the 1965 film The Money Trap.
 Angel's Flight is a low-budget 1965 film noir about a Bunker Hill serial killer, shot on and around Angels Flight in both the downtown and Bunker Hill neighborhoods.
 The only color episode of the original Perry Mason TV series, the February 1966 episode "The Case of the Twice-Told Twist", has a brief scene in the opening act, where Perry Mason (Raymond Burr) and secretary Della Street (Barbara Hale) ride Angels Flight.
 There is a scene shot on the railway in They Came to Rob Las Vegas released in 1968.
 There is a brief shot of the Angels Flight in the introduction of the January 1969 Dragnet episode "Narcotics DR-21".
 Edmund Penney's 15-minute documentary from 1969, Angels Flight Railway, features footage shot in 1965 and during the funicular's last days in 1969.
 The Last Day of Angels Flight was a documentary filmed on the day the railway closed in March 1969.
Bold And The Beautiful 19 October 2010 when Stephanie Forrester and Brook Logan had a ride On Angel Flight
 On November 23, 2010, NBC's The Biggest Loser featured the ride in part of a challenge in which the contestants have to either walk the stairs for 5 points or take the train for 1 point. The winner, accumulating 100 points, won a 2011 Ford Edge.
 Angels Flight is featured in The Muppets (2011) when Jason Segel's character sings the Academy Award-winning song "Man or Muppet".
 The closed Angels Flight was operated for a single day to film Ryan Gosling's and Emma Stone's characters riding it in the 2016 film La La Land.
 Angels Flight appears in the 2017 TV movie The Saint. The scene had Adam Rayner as Simon Templar and Enrique Murciano as FBI Inspector John Henry Fernack.
 Season 4 of the Amazon Studios series Bosch, first aired April 13, 2018, features the landmark and is based on Michael Connelly's book Angels Flight, the sixth book in the Harry Bosch series.
Jonah and Karolina ride Angels Flight in "Old School" Season 2, Episode 4 of Marvel's Runaways (aired on December 21, 2018).  
 The original Third Street Angels Flight is featured in the HBO miniseries Perry Mason.

Literature 
 There are at least five novels titled Angel's Flight or Angels Flight, all with scenes that take place on the funicular and use it as a symbol of some kind. The first novel was Angel's Flight by Don Ryan, published in 1927. Angels Flight was both the name and locale of the 1999 Harry Bosch crime novel by Michael Connelly.
 Raymond Chandler fictionally visited Angels Flight in the 1938 novella The King in Yellow and the 1942 novel The High Window. Chandler's detective Philip Marlowe visits the Bunker Hill area in The Little Sister as well.
 In the 1967 Nick Carter spy novel The Red Guard, Carter takes Angels Flight to reach his safe house located half a block from the upper station.
 Angels Flight is illustrated and at the center of events in the 1965 children's book Piccolo's Prank by Leo Politi.

Music 
 The City of Los Angeles commissioned conductor David Woodard to compose and perform a memorial suite, entitled "An Elegy for Two Angels," in honor of Leon Praport and the funicular itself. The work was first performed at the Hill Street entrance by the Los Angeles Chamber Group on March 15, 2001, during a civic ceremony in which the autograph score was awarded to Praport's widow Lola.
 There are references to Angels Flight in the song "Strange Season" on Michael Penn's 1992 album Free-for-All, and the cover features images of the line and a ticket stating, "Good for one ride".
 "L.A. (My Town)," by the Four Tops, contains a stanza about Olvera Street, Chinatown and Angels Flight. Their ode to Los Angeles is the second-to-last track from their 1970 LP, Still Waters Run Deep.
 "Icy" by ITZY contains dance scenes inside the Angels Flight.
 "Aquatic Mouth Dance" from the album Unlimited Love by Red Hot Chili Peppers mentions Angels Flight in its lyrics: "Dirty skies never worked so hard, better step to the Angels Flight." Lead singer Anthony Kiedis grew up in Los Angeles and many of his songs reference locations in the city.

Visual art 
 Angel's Flight is the title of a famous 1931 oil painting by Millard Sheets, that hangs as part of the permanent collection in the Los Angeles County Museum of Art. It shows two young women on the funicular's upper platform looking down on the nearby houses of Third Street, but the funicular cars themselves are out of the frame.

Games 
 In the game Tony Hawk's American Wasteland, Angels Flight is a gap where the player can grind up or down the rails, the gap being called "Angel Going Up!" or "Angel Going Down!"
 The game L.A. Noire features Angels Flight as one of 30 landmarks across the city. It is the location of the Street Crime side mission, "Shoo-Shoo Bandits"

See also 
 List of funicular railways
 List of heritage railroads in the United States
 List of Los Angeles Historic-Cultural Monuments in Downtown Los Angeles
 National Register of Historic Places listings in Los Angeles

References

External links 

 Official website
 An Elegy for Two Angels
 Angels Flight Virtual Ride
 
 Stills from movies featuring Angels Flight
 
 
 memory.loc.gov. Official L.o.C. HABS/HAER/HALS website

Funicular railways in the United States
Public transportation in Los Angeles
Heritage railroads in California
History of Los Angeles
Los Angeles Historic-Cultural Monuments
National Register of Historic Places in Los Angeles
Transportation in Los Angeles
Tourist attractions in Los Angeles
Bunker Hill, Los Angeles
2 ft 6 in gauge railways in the United States
Cableways on the National Register of Historic Places
Rail infrastructure on the National Register of Historic Places in California
1901 establishments in California